Brenda Villa (born April 18, 1980) is an accomplished American water polo player. She is the most decorated athlete in the world of women’s water polo. Villa was named Female Water Polo Player of the Decade for 2000-2009 by the FINA Aquatics World Magazine. She is one of four female players who competed in water polo at four Olympics; and one of two female athletes who won four Olympic medals in water polo. She is a leading goalscorer in Olympic water polo history, with 31 goals. In 2018, she was inducted into the International Swimming Hall of Fame and the USA Water Polo Hall of Fame.

Career
Villa started swimming with a club team, Commerce Aquatics, at the age of six, and followed her brother into water polo at eight years old. She made the girls Junior Olympic Team while in high school. At Bell Gardens High School, Villa played with the boys' water polo team because her school did not have a girls' team, and went on to become a 4-time 1st team All-League, 4-time 1st team All-C.I.F. and 4-time All-American.

Villa came to Stanford in 1998 as the program’s most heralded recruit. Redshirted in 1999 and 2000 to train for the Olympics, she scored 69 goals her freshman year (2001) and was named the NCAA Women’s Water Polo Player of the Year. In the three seasons Villa played for Stanford University, she scored 172 goals. In 2002, she led her Stanford team with 60 goals to win the NCAA Women's Water Polo Championship; they had finished second the previous season, the first year the competition was held. Villa was awarded the 2002 Peter J. Cutino Award as the top female college water polo player in the United States.

Olympics and international
Villa has been on Team USA since 1998. Although the shortest player on the US national women's water polo team at 5'4", Villa has been a prolific scorer at the international level. She scored 10 goals for Team USA at the 2003 Pan American Games, which qualified the team for the 2004 Summer Olympics. As a 20-year-old, she led the US team with nine goals at the Sydney Olympics, where the Americans took the silver medal. She had a team-high 13 goals to lead the US to gold at the 2003 FINA Water Polo World Championship. In June 2004, Villa scored the first goal in overtime, her third of the game, and another in a penalty shootout, to propel the US team past Hungary and win the gold medal at the Women's Water Polo World League Super Finals. She was the US women's team top scorer with 7 goals in 5 games at the 2004 Athens Olympics, earning a bronze medal. Villa was team captain of the 2005 US national team coached by two-time Olympian Heather Moody, winning a silver medal at the FINA World Championship in Montreal.

In 2005, Villa became assistant coach of the women's water polo team at Cerritos College in Norwalk, California. The Falcons ended the season with a 21-11 record, a new school record for most wins in a season. She spent five years with the Falcons and helped them to a combined 145-26 record from 2005–09, which included the team winning their only CCCAA State Championship in school history (2008). She is now playing professionally for the Italian power team Geymonat Orizzonte in Catania, Sicily, which won the LEN Women's Champions' Cup in 2005 and 2006.

In March 2007 Villa led the USA women's national water polo team in Melbourne, Australia, at the 2007 FINA World Water Polo Championships. Villa scored a total of 11 goals throughout the whole tournament helping team USA achieve first place naming them the 2007 FINA World Champions.

At the 2008 Beijing Summer Olympics, she and the American team lost 8-9 in the championship game to the Netherlands and took home the silver medal.

In June 2009, Villa was named to the USA water polo women's senior national team for the 2009 FINA World Championships. In 2010, she became the head coach at Castilleja High School for girls' water polo in Palo Alto, California.

At the 2012 London Summer Olympics, she and the American team won 8-5 in the championship game to Spain and took home the gold medal, the Americans' first in 4 Olympics water polo competitions.

Personal
Villa's parents immigrated to the United States from Mexico and she speaks fluent Spanish.
A three-time All-American at Stanford, Villa graduated in 2003 with a degree in political science.
Along with some of her teammates from the 2000 Olympic Team, Villa has a small tattoo of the Olympic rings, located on top of her right foot.

International competitions
1995 FINA Junior World Championships, Sainte-Foy, Canada, 3rd place
1997 FINA Junior World Championships, Prague, Czech Republic, 3rd place
1998 FINA World Championships, Perth, Australia, 8th place
1998 Holiday Cup, Los Alamitos, CA, 2nd place
1999 Holiday Cup, Los Alamitos, CA, 3rd place
2000 Summer Olympics, Sydney, Australia, 2nd place
2001 Holiday Cup, Los Alamitos, CA, 1st place
2001 FINA World Championships, Fukuoka, Japan, 4th place
2002 Holiday Cup, Palo Alto, CA, 1st place
2002 FINA World Cup, Perth, Australia, 2nd place
2003 FINA World Championships, Barcelona, Spain, 1st place
2003 Pan American Games, Santo Domingo, Dominican Republic, 1st place
2003 Holiday Cup, Los Alamitos, CA, 1st place
2004 FINA World League, Long Beach, USA, 1st place
2004 Holiday Cup, La Jolla, CA, 1st place
2004 Summer Olympics, Athens, Greece, 3rd place
2005 FINA World League, Kirishi, Russia, 5th place
2005 FINA World Championships, Montreal, Canada, 2nd place
2006 FINA World League, Cosenza, Italy, 1st place
2006 FINA World Cup, Tianjin, China, 4th place
2006 Holiday Cup, Los Alamitos, CA, 1st place
2007 FINA World Championships, Melbourne, Australia, 1st place
2007 FINA World League, Montreal, Canada, 1st place
2007 Holiday Cup, Long Beach, CA, 3rd place
2007 Pan American Games, Rio de Janeiro, Brazil, 1st place
2008 FINA World League, Santa Cruz de Tenerife, Spain, 2nd place
2008 Summer Olympics, Beijing, China, 2nd place
2009 FINA World League, Kirishi, Russia, 1st place
2009 FINA World Championships, Rome, Italy, 1st place
2009 Holiday Cup, Newport Beach, CA, 2nd place
2010 FINA World League, La Jolla, USA, 1st place
2010 FINA World Cup, Christchurch, New Zealand, 1st
2011 FINA World League, Tianjin, China, 1st place
2011 FINA World Championships, Shanghai, China, 6th place
2011 Pan American Games, Guadalajara, Mexico, 1st place
2012 FINA World League, Changsu, China, 1st place
2012 Summer Olympics, London, United Kingdom, 1st place

See also
 Diversity in swimming
 List of multiple Olympic medalists in one event
 List of Olympic champions in women's water polo
 List of Olympic medalists in water polo (women)
 List of players who have appeared in multiple women's Olympic water polo tournaments
 List of women's Olympic water polo tournament top goalscorers
 List of world champions in women's water polo
 List of World Aquatics Championships medalists in water polo
 List of members of the International Swimming Hall of Fame
United States women's Olympic water polo team records and statistics

References

External links
 
 

1980 births
Living people
American sportspeople of Mexican descent
Sportspeople from Los Angeles County, California
American female water polo players
Water polo drivers
Water polo players at the 2000 Summer Olympics
Water polo players at the 2004 Summer Olympics
Water polo players at the 2008 Summer Olympics
Water polo players at the 2012 Summer Olympics
Medalists at the 2000 Summer Olympics
Medalists at the 2004 Summer Olympics
Medalists at the 2008 Summer Olympics
Medalists at the 2012 Summer Olympics
Olympic gold medalists for the United States in water polo
Olympic silver medalists for the United States in water polo
Olympic bronze medalists for the United States in water polo
World Aquatics Championships medalists in water polo
Water polo players at the 2007 Pan American Games
Water polo players at the 2011 Pan American Games
Pan American Games medalists in water polo
Pan American Games gold medalists for the United States
Stanford Cardinal women's water polo players
American water polo coaches
Medalists at the 2011 Pan American Games